Maisy Jude Marion Stella (born December 13, 2003) is a Canadian singer and actress. She is known for her role as Daphne Conrad on the musical television series Nashville (2012–2018). In 2017, she released her debut solo song, "Riding Free", for the soundtrack of the Dreamworks animation series Spirit Riding Free.

Life and career

20032011: Early life 
Stella was born on December 13, 2003, in Oshawa, Ontario. Her parents are Marylynne and Brad Stella, who are members of the country duo the Stellas, and she has an older sister, Lennon Stella.

20122018: Nashville and Lennon & Maisy 
Stella had her breakthrough role starring as Daphne Conrad on the ABC/CMT musical drama television series Nashville (2012–2018), where she starred alongside her sister Lennon Stella. The series premiered on October 10, 2012 and aired its final episode on July 26, 2018.

During her time on Nashville, she also performed alongside her older sister Lennon Stella as the country music duo Lennon & Maisy, performing mostly covers of songs.

Solo work 

In 2016, Stella appeared on the YouTube web series We Are Savvy. The following year, Stella released her debut solo single, "Riding Free", for the soundtrack of the DreamWorks Animation series Spirit Riding Free.

In 2017, Stella also appeared as a guest judge in an episode of Top Chef Jr.

Stalker incident 

In November 2018, a 41-year-old man, Joshua Andrew Stephen Fox, was arrested by the Metro Nashville Police after having stalked Stella for over a year. According to police, the contact started when he reached out to the Stella family through their website, stating that he had relocated to Nashville from Miami to "be with the family".

On November 8, 2018, the FBI met with Fox at a Panera Bread café near Vanderbilt University, after Fox had allegedly sent Stella a "sexual invitation", ordering him to stop all contact with the Stella family. After temporarily deactivating all his social media accounts, Fox reactivated them and, according to police, sent Stella 85 messages and videos, including ones of a sexual nature.

Within the next few days, Fox sent Stella a picture of a woman he had kidnapped and raped at gunpoint. The woman reported the incident the following day, and Fox was arrested in Asheville, North Carolina. He was then transferred to Smith County, Tennessee, to face charges of rape and kidnapping. He was soon released from custody on an $80,000 bond.

Filmography

References 

2003 births
Living people
Actresses from Oshawa
Canadian child actresses
Canadian television actresses
Musicians from Oshawa
21st-century Canadian actresses
21st-century Canadian women singers